Captain Robert Gee  (7 May 1876 – 2 August 1960) was an English-Jewish recipient of the Victoria Cross and a Conservative Member of Parliament.

Biography
Born in Leicester, Gee was orphaned when aged 9. He was sent to the workhouse in Leicester, then to the Countesthorpe Cottage Homes for orphaned children. He enlisted in the Army in 1893. Quartermaster-Serjeant Robert Gee was commissioned as a second lieutenant on 21 May 1915.

He was awarded the Military Cross in for his actions on the first day on the Somme (1 July 1916); "For conspicuous gallantry in action. He encouraged his men during the attack by fearlessly exposing himself and cheering them on. When wounded he refused to retire, and urged his men on till, after being blown into the air by a shell, he was carried in half unconscious."

He was 41 years old, and a temporary captain in the 2nd Battalion, The Royal Fusiliers, British Army during the First World War when he was awarded the Victoria Cross, the highest and most prestigious award for gallantry in the face of the enemy that can be awarded to British and Commonwealth forces, for his actions on 30 November 1917 at Masnières and Les Rues Vertes, France, during a German counter attack in the Battle of Cambrai (1917):

An attack by the enemy captured brigade headquarters and ammunition dump. Captain Gee, finding himself a prisoner, managed to escape and organised a party of the brigade staff with which he attacked the enemy, closely followed by two companies of infantry. He cleared the locality and established a defensive flank, then finding an enemy machine-gun still in action, with a revolver in each hand he went forward and captured the gun, killing eight of the crew. He was wounded, but would not have his wound dressed until the defence was organised.

He later transferred to the Royal West Kent Regiment.

Post war

After the war, Gee went into politics. He first stood for Parliament as a National Democratic Party candidate in the 1918 General Election at Consett, where he finished second.

He then stood for Parliament as a Conservative in the 1921 Woolwich East by-election against Ramsay MacDonald. A great deal of attention was given in the campaign to the contrast between Gee as a Victoria Cross holder and Macdonald as a pacifist who opposed the war. Gee won the seat which he held until the next general election the following year, when he lost to the Labour Party candidate. He stood unsuccessfully in the 1923 Newcastle-upon-Tyne East by-election and in Bishop Auckland in the 1923 United Kingdom general election.

He was elected MP for Bosworth at the 1924 general election. He became disillusioned with parliamentary life however and he was reported to have been absent from his political duties for over a year at the time of his resignation in 1927, having emigrated to the backwoods of Western Australia with no intention of returning. The subsequent 1927 Bosworth by-election was a Liberal gain.

He died in Perth, Western Australia, aged 84. He was cremated at the Karrakatta Crematorium. His Victoria Cross is displayed at the Fusilier Museum in the Tower of London, England.

See also
William Buckingham VC, who also passed through the Countesthorpe Cottage Homes

References

"Elegant Extracts" - The Royal Fusiliers Recipients of the VC (J.P. Kelleher, 2001)
Monuments to Courage (David Harvey, 1999)
The Register of the Victoria Cross (This England, 1997)

External links 
Royal Fusiliers Recipients of the Victoria Cross

1876 births
1980 deaths
Recipients of the Military Cross
British World War I recipients of the Victoria Cross
British Army personnel of World War I
Royal Fusiliers officers
Conservative Party (UK) MPs for English constituencies
National Democratic and Labour Party politicians
UK MPs 1918–1922
UK MPs 1924–1929
Politicians from Leicester
English emigrants to Australia
Queen's Own Royal West Kent Regiment officers
British Army recipients of the Victoria Cross
Burials at Karrakatta Cemetery
English Jews
Jewish British politicians
20th-century English politicians
Military personnel from Leicester
British emigrants to Australia